The Ambassador of the Republic of the Philippines to Brunei Darussalam is the Republic of the Philippines' foremost diplomatic representative in the Sultanate of Brunei. As head of the Philippines' diplomatic mission there, the Ambassador is the official representative of the President and the Government of the Philippines to the Sultan and Government of Brunei. The position has the rank and status of an Ambassador Extraordinary and Plenipotentiary.

List of representatives

Ambassadors

Chargé d’ Affaires

See also 
 Brunei–Philippines relations

Notes and References

External links
 

Brunei–Philippines relations
Brunei
Philippines